Feng Yanke is a Chinese wheelchair fencer. He represented China at the 2016 Summer Paralympics held in Rio de Janeiro, Brazil and he won the gold medal in the Men's Foil B event. At the 2020 Summer Paralympics held in Tokyo, Japan, he won two gold medals in the Men's Sabre B and Men's Foil B event.

References

External links 
 

Living people
Year of birth missing (living people)
Place of birth missing (living people)
Chinese male épée fencers
Chinese male foil fencers
Chinese male sabre fencers
Wheelchair fencers at the 2016 Summer Paralympics
Wheelchair fencers at the 2020 Summer Paralympics
Medalists at the 2016 Summer Paralympics
Medalists at the 2020 Summer Paralympics
Paralympic gold medalists for China
Paralympic medalists in wheelchair fencing
Paralympic wheelchair fencers of China
21st-century Chinese people